Major poetry related events which took place worldwide during 2019 are outlined below under different sections. This includes poetry books released during the year in different languages, major literary awards, poetry festivals and events, besides anniversaries and deaths of renowned poets etc. Nationality words link to articles with information on the nation's poetry or literature (for instance, India or France).

Events
 October 25 – The 2019 Princeton poetry Festival is inaugurated at Lewis Center of Arts by Pulitzer prize winning poet Paul Muldoon.

Selection of works published in English

Australia
 Charmaine Papertalk Green, Nganajungu Yagu
 Gerald Murnane, Green Shadows and Other Poems

Canada
 Gwen Benaway, Holy Wild

India
 Antony Theodore, Jesus Christ in Love
 Nikita Gill, Great Goddesses : Life Lessons from Myths and Monsters
 Tapan Kumar Pradhan, I, She and the Sea
 Tishani Doshi, Small Days and Nights

New Zealand

Pakistan
Fatimah Asghar, If They Come For Us

Palestine
Hala Alyan, The Twenty-ninth Year

Portugal
Ana Luisa Amaral, What’s in a Name

Puerto Rico
Raquel Salas Rivera, While They Sleep (under the bed is another country)

United Kingdom

England
Anthony Anaxagorou, After the Formalities
Deryn Rees-Jones, Erato

Northern Ireland
Rachel Allen, Kingdomland

Scotland

Criticism, scholarship and biography in the United Kingdom

Ukraine
Ilya Kaminsky, Deaf Republic

United States
Hanif Aburraqib, A Fortune for Your Disaster 
Sarah Borjas, Heart Like a Window, Mouth Like a Cliff
Franny Choi, Soft Science
Andrea Cohen, Nightshade
Michael Dickman, Days and Days
Eve Ewing, 1919
Camoghne Felix, Build Yourself a Boat
Olivia Gatwood, Life of the Party
Campbell McGrath, Nouns and Verbs
Jane Mead, To the Wren
Fred Moten, All That Beauty
Jana Prikryl, No Matter

Anthologies in the United States

Criticism, scholarship and biography in the United States

Poets in The Best American Poetry 2019

Works published in other languages

French
Stephane Bouquet, Les Amours Suivants (The Next Loves)

German

Awards and honors by country
See also: List of poetry awards
Awards announced this year:

International
 Struga Poetry Evenings Golden Wreath Laureate : Ana Blandiana for ‘’Romania’’

Australia awards and honors
 Victorian Premier’s Prize for Poetry formerly known as C. J. Dennis Prize for Poetry : Kate Lilley for ‘’Tilt’’ 
 Kenneth Slessor Prize for Poetry : Judith Bishop for ‘’Interval’’

Canada awards and honors
 Archibald Lampman Award: '
 J. M. Abraham Poetry Award: 
 Governor General's Awards: 
 Griffin Poetry Prize : Eve Joseph for ‘’Quarrels’’
 Latner Writers' Trust Poetry Prize: 
 Gerald Lampert Award: 
 Pat Lowther Award: 
 Prix Alain-Grandbois: 
 Raymond Souster Award: 
 Dorothy Livesay Poetry Prize: 
 Prix Émile-Nelligan:

France awards and honors
Prix Goncourt de la Poésie:

India awards and honors
Sahitya Akademi Award : Nand Kishore Acharya for Chhelate Hue Apne Ko (Hindi)
Jnanpith Award : Akkitham Achuthan Namboothiri

New Zealand awards and honors
 Prime Minister's Awards for Literary Achievement:
 Poetry: 
 Mary and Peter Biggs Award for Poetry :

United Kingdom awards and honors
 Cholmondeley Award : Malika Booker 
 Costa Award (formerly "Whitbread Awards") for poetry : Mary Jean Chan for ‘’Fleche’’ 
 English Association's Fellows' Poetry Prizes:
 Eric Gregory Award (for a collection of poems by a poet under the age of 30):
 Forward Poetry Prize: Fiona Benson for ‘’Vertigo and Ghost’’
Best Collection: 
Best Poem:
 Jerwood Aldeburgh First Collection Prize for poetry:
 Manchester Poetry Prize : Momtaza Mehri for ‘’Amniotica’’ 
 National Poet of Wales: 
 National Poetry Competition : Susannah Hart for ‘’Reading the Safeguarding and Child Protection Policy’’
 Queen's Gold Medal for Poetry: 
 T. S. Eliot Prize : Roger Robinson for ‘’A Portable Paradise’’

United States awards and honors
 Arab American Book Award (The George Ellenbogen Poetry Award):
Honorable Mentions: 
 Agnes Lynch Starrett Poetry Prize:
 Anisfield-Wolf Book Award: 
 Beatrice Hawley Award from Alice James Books:
 Bollingen Prize: 
 Jackson Poetry Prize: 
 Gay Poetry: 
 Lesbian Poetry: 
 Lenore Marshall Poetry Prize: 
 Los Angeles Times Book Prize: 
 National Book Award for Poetry (NBA):
 National Book Critics Circle Award for Poetry: 
 The New Criterion Poetry Prize: 
 Pulitzer Prize for Poetry (United States) : Forrest Gander for ‘’Be With’’ 
 Wallace Stevens Award: 
 Whiting Awards: 
 PEN Award for Poetry in Translation: 
 PEN Center USA 2019 Poetry Award: 
 PEN/Voelcker Award for Poetry:                     
 Raiziss/de Palchi Translation Award:
 Ruth Lilly Poetry Prize: 
 Kingsley Tufts Poetry Award: 
 Walt Whitman Prize –         – Judge: 
 Yale Younger Series:

From the Poetry Society of America
 Frost Medal: 
 Shelley Memorial Award: 
 Writer Magazine/Emily Dickinson Award:
 Lyric Poetry Award:
 Alice Fay Di Castagnola Award: 
 Louise Louis/Emily F. Bourne Student Poetry Award: 
 George Bogin Memorial Award: 
 Robert H. Winner Memorial Award: 
 Cecil Hemley Memorial Award:
 Norma Farber First Book Award: 
 Lucille Medwick Memorial Award: 
 William Carlos Williams Award:

Deaths
Birth years link to the corresponding "[year] in poetry" article:
 January 17 – Mary Oliver (b. 1935), American poet, Pulitzer Prize winner
 January 25 – Krishna Sobti (b. 1925), Indian Hindi poet
 March 15 – W. S. Merwin (b. 1927), American poet and translator
 March 20 – Linda Gregg (b. 1942), American poet 
 April 29 – Les Murray (b. 1938), Australian poet and critic 
 July 05 – Marie Ponsot (b. 1921), American poet, critic and essayist 
 September 23 – Al Alvarez (b. 1929), British poet
 October 12 – Kate Braverman (b. 1949), American poet and novelist
 October 15 – Akkitham Achuthan Namboothiri (b. 1926), Indian Malayalam poet and essayist, in Thrissur
 November 7 – Nabaneeta Dev Sen (b. 1938), Indian Bengali poet and writer 
 November 24 – Clive James (b. 1939), Australian-born poet, critic and journalist

See also

 Poetry
 List of years in poetry
 List of poetry awards

References

2010s in poetry
2019 poems
 
2019-related lists
Culture-related lists by year